Arenpura is gram panchayat village in the Sumerpur Tehsil of the Pali district of Rajasthan, India. It contains Sonpura, Galthani, Balwana and  Ramnagar villages.

References

Villages in Pali district